The Mzansi Tour is a staged cycling race held annually in South Africa. It is part of UCI Africa Tour and is rated a 2.2 event. The 2015 event did not take place.

Winners

References

Cycle races in South Africa
2013 establishments in South Africa
Recurring sporting events established in 2013
Autumn events in South Africa
UCI Africa Tour races